Changing of the Gods: Feminism and the End of Traditional Religions is a non-fiction book written by a psychologist of religion and a feminist theologian Naomi Goldenberg. It is a feminist view on traditional male-dominated religions.

References

1979 non-fiction books
Books about religion
English-language books
Feminist books